Andre Peters (born 29 April 1965) is a South African cricketer. He played in 51 first-class matches for Eastern Province between 1982/83 and 1998/99. After his cricketing career, he moved to Australia.

See also
 List of Eastern Province representative cricketers

References

External links
 

1965 births
Living people
South African cricketers
Eastern Province cricketers
Cricketers from Port Elizabeth